Stangerochampsa is an extinct genus of globidontan alligatoroid, possibly an alligatorine or a stem-caiman, from the Late Cretaceous of Alberta. It is based on RTMP.86.61.1, a skull, partial lower jaws, and partial postcranial skeleton discovered in the late Campanian–early Maastrichtian-age Horseshoe Canyon Formation. Stangerochampsa was described in 1996 by Wu and colleagues. The type species is S. mccabei. The generic name honors the Stanger family, the owners of the ranch where the specimen was found, and the species name honors James Ross McCabe, who discovered, collected, and prepared it. It had heterodont dentition, with large crushing teeth at the rear of the jaws.

Classification
Wu and colleagues, using phylogenetic analyses, found their new genus to be closest to Brachychampsa, and then Albertochampsa and Hylaeochampsa successively, as part of a clade within Alligatorinae that also included Allognathosuchus, Ceratosuchus, and Wannaganosuchus.  This arrangement also unites most Mesozoic and Paleogene alligatorines. Brochu (1999), in an analysis of all alligatoroids, found Stangerochampsa and Brachychampsa to be just outside Alligatoridae, and suggested that Stangerochampsa and Albertochampsa were synonymous. Brochu (2004) and Hill and Lucas (2006) also found Stangerochampsa to be outside of Alligatorinae; Hill and Lucas found Albertochampsa to its sister taxon.

Below is a cladogram based on the results of a 2018 tip dating study by Lee & Yates that simultaneously used morphological, molecular (DNA sequencing), and stratigraphic (fossil age) data, which shows Stangerochampsa's placement within Globidonta.

On the other hand, in the phylogenetic analysis conducted by Bona et al. (2018) Stangerochampsa was recovered as an alligatorid, specifically as a stem-caiman, as shown in the cladogram below.

References

Crocodilians
Alligatoridae
Late Cretaceous crocodylomorphs of North America
Late Cretaceous reptiles of North America
Prehistoric pseudosuchian genera